Lupane may refer to:

Lupane District, Zimbabwe
Lupane State University
Lupane (compound) (a type of triterpene compounds)